The 1923 Darlington by-election was a by-election held on 28 February 1923 for the British House of Commons constituency of Darlington in County Durham.

Vacancy 
The seat had become vacant when the sitting Conservative Member of Parliament (MP), Herbert Pease was elevated to the peerage as Baron Daryngton. He had held the seat since the December 1910 general election.

Electoral history

Candidates 
William Pease, who had not previously contested a parliamentary election, stood for the Conservatives.
The Labour Party candidate was W.J. Sherwood, who had also fought the seat in 1922, having contested The Hartlepools in 1918.

Result 
On a slightly reduced turnout, Pease won the seat with a comfortable majority.

Aftermath
Sherwood stood again at the general election in December 1923, losing again to Pease. Pease held the seat until his death in 1926.

See also
Darlington constituency
Darlington
1926 Darlington by-election
1983 Darlington by-election
List of United Kingdom by-elections (1918–1931)

References

1923 elections in the United Kingdom
1923 in England
20th century in County Durham
February 1923 events
1923 by-election
By-elections to the Parliament of the United Kingdom in County Durham constituencies